Solidonia was a natural plant fiber extracted from an African plant that was similar to ramie. Germany developed it, and they used it as a substitute for wool.

Characteristics 
Solidonia was a fine fiber with screw shaped form, resembling wool. The fiber length varied from 2.5 to 6 inches; it was long enough to be spun into yarn with woolen worsted methods of yarn spinning.

Use 
Germany developed  Solidonia during World War I. The German army used clothing made of a blend of wool and solidonia (75% +25%). They used it in underwear, and hosiery, etc.

See also 
 Acrylic fiber

References 

Fibers
Wool industry